Labeuville is a commune in the Meuse department in Grand Est in north-eastern France.

See also
Communes of the Meuse department

References

Communes of Meuse (department)